Chorizopes frontalis is a species of spider of the genus Chorizopes. It is found from Sri Lanka to Sumatra.

See also 
 List of Araneidae species

References

Araneidae
Fauna of Sumatra
Spiders of Asia
Spiders described in 1870